Lobanovo is a rural locality (a village) in Novlyanskoye Rural Settlement, Selivanovsky District, Vladimir Oblast, Russia. The population was 151 as of 2010. There are 3 streets.

Geography 
Lobanovo is located 9 km south of Krasnaya Gorbatka (the district's administrative centre) by road. Novlyanka is the nearest rural locality.

References 

Rural localities in Selivanovsky District